h
The B4319 is a road in Pembrokeshire in Wales. It heads for Castlemartin, passes Freshwater West and terminates at its junction with the B4320 at  near Angle.

References

Roads in Wales
Transport in Pembrokeshire